
Gmina Żuromin is an urban-rural gmina (administrative district) in Żuromin County, Masovian Voivodeship, in east-central Poland.

Villages
Apart from the town of Żuromin, Gmina Żuromin contains the villages and settlements of Będzymin, Brudnice, Chamsk, Cierpigórz, Dąbrowa, Dąbrowice, Dębsk, Franciszkowo, Kliczewo Duże, Kliczewo Małe, Kosewo, Kruszewo, Młudzyn, Nowe Nadratowo, Olszewo, Raczyny, Rozwozin, Rzężawy, Sadowo, Stare Nadratowo, Tadajówka, Wiadrowo and Wólka Kliczewska.

Neighbouring gminas
Gmina Żuromin is bordered by the gminas of Bieżuń, Kuczbork-Osada, Lubowidz, Lutocin and Szreńsk.

References
Polish official population figures 2006

Zuromin
Żuromin County